Robert Samuel Kiernan (born 13 January 1991) is a professional footballer who plays as a defender for USL Championship side Orange County SC. Born in England, he has represented the Republic of Ireland at youth level. 

Kiernan has previously played for Watford, Wigan Athletic and Rangers, and has also spent time on loan at Kilmarnock, Yeovil Town, Bradford City, Wycombe Wanderers, Accrington Stanley, Burton Albion, Brentford, Southend United and Birmingham City. Kiernan, who was born in Hertfordshire, played for the Republic of Ireland at youth levels up to and including under-21.

Club career

Watford
Kiernan was born in Rickmansworth, Hertfordshire, and began his football career as a youngster with Watford. Watford sent two youth squads to the Milk Cup in Northern Ireland in the summer of 2008. Kiernan was moved from his natural position of central midfielder to play centre-half, to take advantage of his height and physical presence, and also captained the side. His performances drew praise from his then coach Mark Warburton.

Later that summer, Kiernan was called up by the Ireland under-19 team for a four-nation tournament, but he had to withdraw after tearing his right thigh muscle.

Kiernan captained Watford's under-18 side in 2008–09, in which they reached the quarter-finals of the FA Youth Cup. In October 2008, he, together with fellow second-year scholars Billy Gibson and Ross Jenkins, signed "developmental contracts" – professional contracts signed earlier than usual, allowing the players to continue their scholarships without the pressure of worrying about the future –to run until the end of the 2009–10 season.

When Brendan Rodgers was appointed Watford manager in November 2008, Kiernan began to take part in some first-team training sessions. He was included in the senior matchday squad for the first time on 24 January 2009 for an FA Cup fourth-round tie against Crystal Palace at Vicarage Road, and made his debut as a 90th-minute substitute, replacing Gavin Hoyte, as Watford won 4–3. Although he made no more first-team appearances that season, he finish with 17 starts for the Academy side and 9 for the reserves.

Loans
After a trial in January 2010, Kiernan joined Scottish Premier League side Kilmarnock on loan; manager Jimmy Calderwood wanted him as cover with two defensive players injured. He joined Kilmarnock on the same day as Watford teammate Scott Severin, and was given the number 29 shirt. Kiernan made his debut the next day as a 73rd-minute substitute in a 1–0 league win against Celtic. Kiernan played three matches for Yeovil Town at the start of the 2010–11 season, and on 12 November joined Bradford City on a two-month loan. Conference side Histon had previously attempted to sign Kiernan on loan.

Wigan Athletic
At the end of the 2010–11 season, Kiernan rejected Watford's offer of a new two-year contract; the "slightly reduced" terms offered entitled him to leave the club without compensation becoming payable by his next employer. He signed for Premier League club Wigan Athletic, In March 2012, having failed to feature in Wigan's first team, Kiernan joined League Two Accrington Stanley on loan for the remainder of the season, but ankle ligament damage cut the loan spell to just three matches. He returned to match fitness with the help of a month's loan at Burton Albion, also of League Two, in the early part of the following season, and in November moved on to League One Brentford on loan until January 2013.
He then renewed his loan deal on 11 January 2013. On 12 October 2013, Kiernan joined League Two side Southend United on a three-month loan deal, however, he was recalled on 29 December, as cover after Thomas Rogne was injured on Boxing Day. Kiernan made a strong end to the 2013–14 season, scoring his first goal for the club against Leicester City and featuring in the play-off semi-final defeat by Queens Park Rangers, and signed a three-year contract extension in May 2014.

However, after struggling to feature the following season, Kiernan joined then Championship club Birmingham City in February 2015 on loan until the end of the 2014–15 season. He made his debut on 21 February at Brighton & Hove Albion, starting the match in central midfield in place of the injured David Davis, and played 78 minutes of the 4–3 defeat. He went on to form a partnership at centre-half with Jonathan Spector, and then played alongside Michael Morrison after the latter's return from injury. Kiernan was credited with his first goal for the club on 11 April against Wolverhampton Wanderers; he scored from close range after Jonathan Grounds' shot had already crossed the line unnoticed by the officials and been pushed back into play. A hamstring injury meant he missed the last two matches of the season.

Rangers
On 22 June 2015, Kiernan signed a two-year deal at Rangers with the transfer fee reported to be £200,000. Over the course of the subsequent season, he played in central defence alongside Danny Wilson. The pair, however, received criticism for some of their performances, notably in the team's 3–2 loss to Hibernian in the 2016 Scottish Cup Final. On 19 July 2016, Kiernan extended his contract with Rangers for another year, until 2018. Kiernan scored his first goal for Rangers and only his third goal of his professional career on 10 December 2016, heading a James Tavernier free-kick to net the first of two goals as Rangers won 2–0. On 27 December 2016, he was linked with a £2m move to Fulham and the following day, during Rangers' 1–1 draw with St Johnstone, Kiernan appeared to strike Saints captain Steven Anderson. For this, Kiernan was offered a two-match suspension for violent conduct by the Scottish Football Association, however he chose to contest the charge, and it was ultimately dismissed by disciplinary tribunal on 12 January.

Southend United
Kiernan returned to English football in 2017, signing a three-year contract with League One club Southend United on 3 August for an undisclosed fee. Kiernan was released by Southend on 31 January 2020.

Orange County SC
On 7 February 2020, Kiernan joined USA club Orange County SC.

International career
Kiernan has captained the Republic of Ireland national football team at age-group levels. He qualified to play for Ireland as his father was born in Co. Wexford.

Career statistics

Honours

Rangers
Scottish Championship: 2015–16
Scottish Challenge Cup: 2015–16

Orange County SC
USL Championship: 2021

References

External links

1991 births
Living people
People from Rickmansworth
English footballers
Republic of Ireland association footballers
Republic of Ireland youth international footballers
Republic of Ireland under-21 international footballers
Association football defenders
Association football central defenders
Association football utility players
Watford F.C. players
Kilmarnock F.C. players
Yeovil Town F.C. players
Bradford City A.F.C. players
Wycombe Wanderers F.C. players
Wigan Athletic F.C. players
Accrington Stanley F.C. players
Burton Albion F.C. players
Brentford F.C. players
Southend United F.C. players
Birmingham City F.C. players
Rangers F.C. players
Orange County SC players
English Football League players
Scottish Premier League players
Scottish Professional Football League players
USL Championship players